Chichester West is an electoral division of West Sussex in the United Kingdom, and returns one member to sit on West Sussex County Council. The current County Councillor, Louise Goldsmith, is also Cabinet Member for Finance & Resources.

Extent
The division covers the western part of the town of Chichester; and the villages of Bosham, East Ashling, Fishbourne, Funtington, West Ashling and West Stoke.

It comprises the following Chichester District wards: Bosham Ward, Chichester West Ward, Fishbourne Ward and Funtington Ward; and of the following civil parishes: Bosham, the western part of Chichester, Fishbourne and Funtington.

Election results

2013 Election
Results of the election held on 2 May 2013:

2009 Election
Results of the election held on 4 June 2009:

2005 Election
Results of the election held on 5 May 2005:

References
Election Results - West Sussex County Council

External links
 West Sussex County Council
 Election Maps

Electoral Divisions of West Sussex